Abang Long Fadil 2 is a 2017 Malaysian Malay-language action comedy film written and directed by Syafiq Yusof. It is the sequel to KL Gangster’s 2014 film Abang Long Fadil also written and directed by Syafiq Yusof. The film stars Zizan Razak, Syamsul Yusof, AC Mizal, Tania Hudson, Wak Doyok, Achey Bocey, Shuib Sepahtu, A. Galak and Mas Khan. The Abang Long Fadil 2 divulges its titular character who is mistaken for a professional assassin named Tiger. He is unwillingly dragged into the underworld by mafia leader Taji Samprit and his son Wak Doyok. Tania plays Yana, Fadil's love interest and a broadcast journalist assigned to cover Tiger's case while Syamsul plays Inspector Wahab who is investigating the case.

Abang Long Fadil 2 is a collaboration between Skop Productions and Astro Shaw productions. Filming took place in 2015, while post-production took two years to complete.
The film was released on 24 August 2017 in 130 cinemas nationwide and lasted for 56 days. 
 
The film became a critical and commercial success, grossing over RM17.9 million, making it the highest-grossing Malaysian film of 2017 and the tenth highest-grossing Malaysian all-time, beating 2015's Polis Evo. Its third sequel, Abang Long Fadil 3 set to be released on September 8, 2022.

Plot
Abang Long Fadil 2 continues the journey of Fadil, who falls into the mafia world mastered by Taji Samprit and his son Wak Doyok. A particular incident causes Fadil to be mistaken by Inspector Wahab and Inspector Shuib as a notorious mercenary named Tiger.

At the same time, Yana, a TVKL reporter who often covered Tiger's murder cases, is also trapped in a fugitive problem faced by Fadil. Fadil is forced to live as a murderer despite his innocence. His first target is Kingkong, a crazy mafia and an enemy to Taji Samprit.

Various acts and situations took place in Fadil's life as a mercenary. The only one way to clear his name is to look for Tiger's true identity to correct the situation and to prove his innocence.

Later that evening, Fadil went to King Kong's club with disguise as the bombay. Before Fadil could kill him, King Kong's already dead. The police arrived at the night club where Tiger (Fadil) allegedly have killed King Kong. Inspector Wahab and his partner pursued Tiger (Fadil) until they met an accident where Inspector Wahab and his colleagues were injured while pursuing Tiger (Fadil).

Wak Doyok paid RM 10 million and hired Fadil to kill Taji Samprit because he had hired him to kill his own mother. He wanted him to kill Taji Samprit and confiscate a lock on which the key was kept by his own father. Inspector Wahab and Inspector Shuib visited Yana's house and questioned the murder of Datin Mona who killed Tiger. Inspector Wahab advised Yana that the suspect was dangerous.

All three have been attacked by Cobra, brother of King Kong. After the car crash, Fadil ordered Ali and Yana to leave and let Fadil stay to fight with Cobra. After Cobra severely attacks Fadil and avenges his brother's death, he forgives Cobra and invites him to his house where RM 500,000 is stashed.

At the same time, Wak Doyok was shocked when his father was still alive and that he has ordered his gangs to attack his own son. He almost defeated Taji Samprit's gangs, including Rudy. He fights with his father but is defeated. Taji Samprit tries to kill Wak Doyok, but is killed by Tiger. He explained to Wak Doyok that Fadil was a subordinate gangster. Wak Doyok got angry and orders him to kill Fadil.

In the warehouse area, Fadil throws the locket to Wak Doyok and Wak Doyok unties Yana, but Tiger and Wak Doyok teamed up together to kill Fadil. Starting in the final showdown, Fadil and Yana escaped from Wak Doyok but to no avail. While Cobra fights with Tiger to avenge his brother's death. Fadil wants to kill Wak Doyok, until Inspector Wahab and Inspector Shuib surround all the warehouse areas. Inspector Shuib aims Inspector Wahab because Shuib knows he is the Taji's right-hand man. But Inspector Wahab explained that Fadil was innocent. However, Inspector Wahab hired Rudy to work as a police officer. Wahab's inspector reminded that the camouflage of Tiger, Ali.

Continued in the final showdown, Cobra was killed by Ali. Inspector Wahab and Inspector Shuib chased Ali up to Inspector Wahab and Inspector Shuib shot Ali with some explosives. Ali revives, but Inspector Wahab shoots Ali to death. Wak Doyok fights with Fadil again, until Wak Doyok defeats Fadil. Wak Doyok wanted to kill Fadil but he was saved by Yana who gets a bullet shot by firing gun of Wak Doyok. Fadil was very angry, then fought Wak Doyok. Fadil managed to defeat Wak Doyok and police arrested Wak Doyok. Yana was sent to hospital after being shot by Wak Doyok. Inspector Wahab and Inspector Shuib thanked Fadil for assisting the police and frees Fadil.

Fadil opens Taji's container using Taji's key in the locket. There is a bunch of money that Taji Samprit kept. Now Fadil and Yana becomes rich. Fadil bought his own car and Datuk Yusof Haslam will make another movie called 'Abang Long Fadil 3'. Fadil will make the film called 'Abang Long Fadil vs. Transformers' but it will not be released at the cinema because Fadil has been jailed.

Cast
 Zizan Razak as Fadil
 Syamsul Yusof as Inspector Wahab
 AC Mizal as Kingkong/Cobra, partner Taji Samprit and twin brother Kingkong
 Tania Hudson as Yana, reporter TVKL and love-interest Fadil
 Wak Doyok as Wak Doyok, son Taji Samprit
 Achey Bocey as Ali/ Tiger, cameraman TVKL and assassin Taji
 Shuib Sepahtu as Inspector Shuib
 A. Galak as Taji Samprit  
 Mas Khan as Rudy, undercover for Inspector Wahab

Supporting cast
 Delimawati as Datin Mona
 Hafiz Bahari as Kingkong's thug
 Syed Haikal as Security Guard
 Ashraf Rahman as Mat-motor

Special appearance
 Fad Anuar as cast
 Yusof Haslam as himself

Production

Pre-production launching ceremony was held on 13 November 2015 at Haslam Restaurant, Kuala Lumpur. Film production started on 15 November 2015 with shooting taking place around Kuala Lumpur, Port Klang and Putrajaya for 50 days. Around 30% of the film involved computer-generated imagery.

Soundtrack

The original soundtrack for this film is "Senorita" by Syamsul Yusof and AC Mizal featuring Shuib. The music video for the song were uploaded to YouTube on 1 August 2017 and received positive response from local audiences.

Sequel
According to Yusof Haslam, due to the success of Abang Long Fadil 2, Skop Productions has green-lit the sequel Abang Long Fadil 3 with budget of RM4 million and filming will start after Aidilfitri celebration by end-June 2018.

See also
 List of Malaysian films of 2017
 Cinema of Malaysia

References

External links
 

2017 films
Malay-language films
2017 action comedy films
Malaysian action comedy films
Skop Productions films
Astro Shaw films
Films produced by Yusof Haslam
Films about contract killing
Films directed by Syafiq Yusof
Malaysian sequel films